Alejandro 'Álex' Cortell Palanca (born 8 November 1990) is a Spanish professional footballer who plays for CD Olímpic de Xàtiva as a forward.

Football career
Born in Moncada, Valencia, Cortell graduated with Valencia CF's youth setup, but moved abroad in the 2009 summer after signing with Belgian Pro League club Royal Excelsior Mouscron. On 8 August 2009 he made his professional debut, coming on as a first-half substitute in a 0–0 home draw against K.S.V. Roeselare, but left in December due to unpaid wages.

Cortell subsequently returned to his native country and represented Ribarroja CF and UD Alzira, both in Tercera División. After scoring 20 goals for the latter he returned to Valencia, being assigned to the reserves in Segunda División B.

Cortell continued to appear in the third division in the following years, representing CD Olímpic de Xàtiva, CE Sabadell FC, CD Alcoyano, Lleida Esportiu, UD Socuéllamos and Atlético Levante UD. He returned to Olímpic on 1 August 2018, with the club now in the fourth level.

References

External links
 
 

1990 births
Living people
People from Horta Nord
Sportspeople from the Province of Valencia
Spanish footballers
Footballers from the Valencian Community
Association football forwards
Segunda División B players
Tercera División players
UD Alzira footballers
Valencia CF Mestalla footballers
CD Olímpic de Xàtiva footballers
CE Sabadell FC footballers
CD Alcoyano footballers
Lleida Esportiu footballers
UD Socuéllamos players
Atlético Levante UD players
Belgian Pro League players
Royal Excel Mouscron players
Spanish expatriate footballers
Expatriate footballers in Belgium
Spanish expatriate sportspeople in Belgium